Return to Halloweentown (also known as Halloweentown 4) is a Disney Channel Original Movie that premiered on Friday October 20, 2006, and is the fourth and final film in the Halloweentown series. The story follows Marnie Piper (Sara Paxton) going to college at Witch University in Halloweentown, where dark forces try to control her magic.

This is the only film in the Halloweentown series not to feature Kimberly J. Brown as Marnie, although Joey Zimmerman, Debbie Reynolds, Judith Hoag, and Lucas Grabeel reprise their roles. Sophie Piper, played by Emily Roeske in the previous films, is mentioned but does not appear. This film also marks the first Disney Channel Original Movie franchise to produce a fourth installment. The premiere scored 7.5 million viewers. The DVD was released on August 28, 2007.

Plot
One year after the events of the last movie, a now eighteen-year-old Marnie is offered a full scholarship to Halloweentown's Witch University for her good deeds and help in the previous years. Much to her mother Gwen's dismay, Marnie decides to forgo her original college plans and instead attends the Halloweentown school. Gwen forces Marnie's brother Dylan to accompany and keep an eye on her. The school is not what it seems, as witches and warlocks cannot use magic; instead they learn about Shakespeare and old magic history. Marnie had thought she would learn how to use her magic and is now crestfallen. 

Marnie runs into her old friend Ethan and makes a new friend named Aneesa the Genie. She also makes three new enemies in the Sinister Sisters: Scarlett, Sapphire and Sage, a triad of malevolent, extremely snobby, spoiled, and manipulative witches who are the daughters of Silas Sinister and with whom Dylan is immediately infatuated. Marnie discovers that she is responsible for the university's restriction of magic. The university was originally established exclusively for warlocks and witches to learn how to use magic. But when the portal between Halloweentown and the human world was opened permanently instead of just on Halloween, most of them went to college in the mortal realm. Since then, Witch University has allowed other magical creatures to attend. The classes are boring for Marnie until she uncovers within the dungeon of the college, a box, with the name "S. Cromwell" inscribed on it, magically appearing in front of her. However, the box is locked and has no key with it. 

Marnie meets with one of her professors, Miss Periwinkle, and asks for an explanation. Periwinkle only tells Marnie that the S. stands for Splendora and that she and her were very good friends. Marnie and Dylan learn that the box contains the Gift, a magical power only a Cromwell can use, which Splendora locked in the box centuries ago. Meanwhile, the Sinister sisters use Dylan's infatuation with them to make him do their homework and use as bait for Marnie. Later, Ethan tells Marnie about a mysterious group, his father was part of, known as the Dominion that will try to use Marnie to open the box, but Marnie does not believe him. Marnie later travels to the past to meet Splendora and learn about the true nature of the enigmatic gift. Splendora explains that the Gift is an amulet that bestows the wearer with the power to control anyone, a power that witches are forbidden to use. Marnie realizes that her principal and Dr. Grogg are in the Dominion and Splendora bestows upon her the key to the box containing the Gift. Splendora is revealed to be Marnie's grandmother Aggie. Agatha is her middle name and she hates the Splendora part so she eventually dropped it. Marnie returns to the present with the key to open the box.

Chancellor Goodwin steals the Gift for the Dominion and the Sinisters to take over Halloweentown. Knowing that only a Cromwell can use the Gift, the Sinister Sisters transform Dylan into a Border Collie to compel Marnie to comply with their demands. If Dylan is not turned back by midnight, he will stay that way forever. They agree to return him to his natural form if Marnie controls Halloweentown for them. Marnie falsely agrees to aid them in their plot, initially using the Gift to control the people at Witch University. However, she turns on them once she has Aneesa trap the Gift in her lamp. With the Gift trapped in the lamp, Marnie, Dylan, Gwen, and Aneesa destroy the lamp, which destroys the Gift. The Dominion attempt an escape, but are apprehended by Periwinkle who is revealed to have been undercover for ten centuries as a detective of the Halloweentown Anti-Dominion League. She imprisons them in a Witch's Glass where she has stripped them of their magic and arrested them for treason.

The malevolent Sinister Sisters lose their powers as well, but Marnie learns that Ethan willingly gave his powers up after his father was found guilty in the previous film. Marnie and Ethan begin a new relationship and leave on a date. The movie ends when Dylan discovers that Marnie did not destroy the Gift, but instead left it for him in a book. Since spells cast on the grounds of Witch University become permanent at midnight, the Gift belongs to him, as he is the only person Marnie trusts with its power. Saving the power of the Gift for important uses only, he puts the book away, and it shows a glowing red S at the end of the film.

Cast

 Sara Paxton as Marnie Piper, an 18-year-old witch. She was portrayed by Kimberly J. Brown in the previous films.
 Paxton also portrays a younger version of Debbie Reynolds' character
 Lucas Grabeel as Ethan Dalloway, the son of Edgar Dalloway who becomes Marnie's latest love interest.
 Joey Zimmerman as Dylan Piper, the brother of Marnie.
 Summer Bishil as Aneesa, a genie who Marnie befriends.
 Judith Hoag as Gwen Piper, the mother of Marnie.
 Kristy Wu as Scarlett, a girl at Witch University.
 Katie Cockrell as Sage, the sister of Scarlett Sinister.
 Kellie Cockrell as Sapphire, the sister of Scarlett and the twin sister of Sage.
 Keone Young as Silas Sinister, the head of Sinster Inc., father of the Sinister Sisters, and leader of the Dominion.
 Leslie Wing as Chancellor Goodwin, the chancellor of Witch University and member of the Dominion.
 Millicent Martin as Professor Priscilla Persimmon Periwinkle, a friendly professor that Marnie befriends.
 Debbie Reynolds as Splendora Agatha "Aggie" Cromwell, Marnie's grandmother.
 Scott Stevenson as Dr. Ichabod Grogg, a strict professor at Witch University and member of the Dominion.
 Christopher Robin Miller as Burp-Urp-Snurt-Pfsfsfsfst III, a goblin who the Sinister Sisters pick on. He was credited as "Young Troll."

Production
In a 2017 interview with E!, producer Sheri Singer said the recasting of Marnie, "was not something we wanted to do. We could not come to terms that we felt were fair. We just weren't able to. We couldn't make the deal work. That was why [she was recast] and we didn't want to not do it. I know people didn't like it, but it's not like people haven't been recast before. I always was sorry that's how it went."

Reception
The premiere was seen by a total of over 7.5 million viewers in the United States making it the most-watched basic cable program of the day, and making it the fourth highest-rated Disney Channel Movie at the time of its airing.

Unlike the first three installments, which all received positive reviews, this film received a more mixed reaction. On review aggregator Rotten Tomatoes it has only four reviews from critics, two positive and two negative. The film received heavy criticism for not casting original lead actress Kimberly J. Brown as Marnie, despite her being available for the shoot. Brown herself has publicly stated her disappointment with the recasting. Katie Heaney at BuzzFeed stated the first three movies are the best thing about Halloween, and that the fourth film was "best left ignored". Stacey Grant at MTV said everyone should pretend Return to Halloweentown never happened, due to the recasting.

Score
On October 27, 2020, Kenneth Burgomaster who composed, orchestrated, and conducted the soundtrack for the film uploaded the full score to his YouTube channel.

See also
 Halloweentown (1998)
 Halloweentown II: Kalabar's Revenge (2001)
 Halloweentown High (2004)

References

External links
 
 
 

Halloweentown (film series)
2006 television films
2006 films
American fantasy comedy films
Television sequel films
Films about witchcraft
Films shot in Utah
American television films
2000s monster movies
American monster movies
Films set in universities and colleges
Films set in 2003
Films directed by David Jackson (director)
2000s American films